The Federal Parliament of the West Indies Federation was the bicameral legislature in West Indies Federation from 1958 to 1962. It was established as the legislative body in the intended federation of British Caribbean. 
One election was held, in 1958.

President of the Senate
The upper chamber was called Senate, and it had 19 members, appointed by Governor-General of the West Indies Federation.

Speaker of the House of Representatives
The lower chamber was called House of Representatives, and it had popularly elected 45 members.

See also
West Indies Federation
List of legislatures by country

References

West Indies Federation
British West Indies
History of the Caribbean
1958 establishments in North America
1962 disestablishments in North America
1958 establishments in the British Empire
1962 disestablishments in the British Empire
20th-century disestablishments in the Caribbean